Clystea gracilis is a moth of the subfamily Arctiinae. It was described by Heinrich Benno Möschler in 1877. It is found in Suriname and Rio de Janeiro, Brazil.

References

Clystea
Moths described in 1877